Ķekava Municipality is a municipality in Latvia. The municipality was formed in 2009 by merging Baloži town, Daugmale Parish and Ķekava Parish, the administrative centre being Ķekava. 

On 1 July 2021, Ķekava Municipality was enlarged when the former Baldone Municipality was merged into it. The territory of Ķekava Municipality is defined by Latvian law as belonging partly of the region of Vidzeme and partly to Semigallia.

Sightseeing
 Local History Museum of Ķekava
 Museum of Daugmale elementary school
 Pines of Katlakalns
 Ostvald's canal
 Ķekava (Dole) Lutheran Church
 Lutheran church in Odukalns
 Katlakalns Church
 Dole Recreation center
 Ķekava primary school
 Manor house of Rāmava
 Memorial stone to honor repressed people from the region
 E. Ostwald's Memorial stone
 Gravestones of Garlieb Merkel and Johann Heinrich Baumann in Katlakalns cemetery
 Memorial stone for Roberts Mūrnieks
 Memorial stone "Refugee road"
 Jāņi Hill – sacred hill of ancestors
 Death Island
 World War I cemetery at Truseļi
 Katlakalns World War I cemetery
 Baloži Frog
 Fountain in Baloži
 Titurga lake
 Daugmale castle mound
 Mūlkalns

Twin towns — sister cities

Ķekava is twinned with:

 Bordesholm, Germany
 Braslaw, Belarus
 Gostyń, Poland
 Nilüfer, Turkey
 Nizami, Azerbaijan
 Pskov, Russia
 Raseiniai, Lithuania

Images

See also
Administrative divisions of Latvia

References

External links
 

 
Municipalities of Latvia
Vidzeme
Semigallia